Berkley Bridge may refer to:

 Berkley Bridge (Virginia), a bridge on Interstate 264 in Norfolk, Virginia
 Berkley-Dighton Bridge, a bridge between Berkley and Dighton over the Taunton River in Massachusetts, known locally as the Berkley Bridge